David H. Scofield (December 12, 1840 – September 30, 1905) was a Union Army soldier during the American Civil War. He received the Medal of Honor for gallantry during the Battle of Cedar Creek fought near Middletown, Virginia on October 19, 1864. The battle was the decisive engagement of Major General Philip Sheridan’s Valley Campaigns of 1864 and was the largest battle fought in the Shenandoah Valley.

Scofield enlisted in the Army from Stamford, Connecticut, in October 1861, and was assigned to the 5th New York Cavalry as a sergeant. He was promoted to regimental quartermaster sergeant in July 1864, and mustered out with his regiment in July 1865.

Medal of Honor citation
"The President of the United States of America, in the name of Congress, takes pleasure in presenting the Medal of Honor to Quartermaster Sergeant David H. Scofield, United States Army, for extraordinary heroism on 19 October 1864, while serving with Company K, 5th New York Cavalry, in action at Cedar Creek, Virginia, for capture of flag of 13th Virginia Infantry (Confederate States of America)."

See also

List of Medal of Honor recipients
List of American Civil War Medal of Honor recipients: Q-S

References

External links
Military Times Hall of Valor

1840 births
1905 deaths
People from Mamaroneck, New York
People of New York (state) in the American Civil War
People of Connecticut in the American Civil War
Union Army soldiers
United States Army Medal of Honor recipients
American Civil War recipients of the Medal of Honor
Military personnel from Connecticut